Evessen is a municipality in the district of Wolfenbüttel, in Lower Saxony, Germany.

References

External links
 

Wolfenbüttel (district)